The African Queen may refer to:

Horticulture
 African Queen, a cultivar of Osteospermum, a member of the sunflower family

Vessels
 African Queen (boat), the vessel used in the 1951 film The African Queen
 African Queen (ship), including a list of ships with the name

Film and literature
 The African Queen (novel), a 1935 novel by C. S. Forester
 The African Queen (film), a 1951 film adaptation starring Humphrey Bogart and Katharine Hepburn
 The African Queen (1977 film), a television film starring Warren Oates and Mariette Hartley

Music
 African Queen, a 1981 album and song by Belgian pop group Allez Allez
 African Queen, a version of Billy Ocean's 1984 song "Caribbean Queen"
 African Queen, a song by 2face Idibia from the 2004 album Face 2 Face
 African Queen, a 2021 album by Makhadzi